The Chaamba are an Arab tribe in the northern Sahara of central Algeria. They are a large tribe of Bedouins and live in a large desert territory to the south of the Atlas Mountains, around Metlili, El Golea, Ouargla, El Oued, and the Great Western Erg, including Timimoun and Béni Abbès While traditionally they were nomads specialised in raising camels and caravan trade, most have settled in the oases over the past century. The date palm is the most important agricultural product for the Chaamba.

Origin 
The Chaamba are of Arab origin and are descended from Banu Sulaym who migrated from the Arabian Peninsula with Banu Hilal. They speak an Arabic dialect classified as Hilalian.

History 
In 1937 it was estimated that 80 percent of all shops in the southwestern Sahara in Algeria were owned by the Chaamba and in 1961 they had a population of 20,000 people. In 1984 clashes broke out between the Maliki Sunni Chaamba and Ibadi Mozabites. In 2008 there were several clashes between Chaamba and Mozabite youths in the oasis of Berriane, following a miscarriage caused by a firework. Clashes broke out again in July 2015 between the Chaamba and Mozabites in the Mzab valley which left at least 22 dead and hundreds injured.

References

Arab tribes in Algeria